Cairnhill FC is a former Singapore football club which competed in the Singapore National Football League in the 1980s. The club won the Division 2 title in 1982.

References

External links 
Singapore 1983
 Cairnhill win
 Cairnhill champs
 Page 39 Miscellaneous Column 1
 A friendly for Cairnhill
 Page 48 Miscellaneous Column 1

Football clubs in Singapore